Philippians 3 is the third chapter of the Epistle to the Philippians in the New Testament of the Christian Bible. It is authored by Paul the Apostle, probably in the mid-50s or early 60s CE and addressed to the Christians in Philippi. This chapter contains Paul's comments and exhortations centering on a narrative about his life.

Text
The original text was written in Koine Greek. This chapter is divided into 21 verses. The Philippians Fragments Hypothesis suggests that  to  constitutes a separate letter from the rest of the text, known as the Kampfbrief or Letter C.

Textual witnesses
Some early manuscripts containing the text of this chapter are:
Papyrus 16 (3rd century; extant verses 10–17)
Codex Vaticanus (325-350)
Codex Sinaiticus (330-360)
Codex Alexandrinus (400-440)
Codex Ephraemi Rescriptus (~450; extant verses 1-4)
Codex Freerianus (~450; extant verses 4-6, 14-17)
Codex Claromontanus (~550)

Paul's re-evaluation of values through Christ (3:1–11)
Paul tells his own story to draw the people's minds back to Christ, how he 'emptied himself' for Christ's sake and how his ultimate goal was now to follow the "upward call of God" (verse 14) to the end. Paul describes how his values had changed since becoming a follower of Christ. Jesuit theologian Robert Murray describes this process as a "transvaluation of values", using a phrase adopted from the philosophy of Friedrich Nietzsche.

Verse 3
 For we are the circumcision, who worship God in the Spirit, rejoice in Christ Jesus, and have no confidence in the flesh,

Verse 5
 circumcised the eighth day, of the stock of Israel, of the tribe of Benjamin, a Hebrew of the Hebrews; concerning the law, a Pharisee;
Luke 2:21 of Jesus), so Paul became "a member of the covenant from infancy".

Verse 8
 Yet indeed I also count all things loss for the excellence of the knowledge of Christ Jesus my Lord, for whom I have suffered the loss of all things, and count them as rubbish, that I may gain Christ

"I count all things loss": in comparison to knowing Christ, anything else falls short.
"The excellence of the knowledge of Christ Jesus": is not meant subjectively about the knowledge "in Christ" or "about Christ" (as God or as man), but objectively, knowing him in person, as God of all, mainly as "Savior and Redeemer", as Paul emphasizes using the words, "my Lord". The knowledge is attained, not by natural enlightenment, nor by reasoning, nor by the law of Moses, but by the Gospel of the grace of God. The efficient cause of this knowledge is God the Father, the Son, and the Spirit; the Father reveals Christ to his followers; the Son gives them an understanding to know him; and the Spirit gives wisdom and revelation in the knowledge of him. This spiritual knowledge of Christ is more excellent than a knowledge of Christ as human, as the knowledge of Christ from the Gospel is also more excellent than that of the legal dispensation, by promises, prophecies, and the ceremonial law.
 "For whom I have suffered the loss of all things": Paul dropped all confidence in his bodily privileges, civil, ceremonial, and moral righteousness, for Christ and his righteousness; losing his own good name and reputation among men, suffering many kinds of persecutions, losing the comforts of life, often in cold or nakedness, in hunger or thirst, even being ready to lose his own life for professing and preaching Christ.
"Count them as rubbish" (KJV: "dung"): or "dog's meat", what is only fit for dogs; that is, Paul treats as "worthless" his pedigree, religion sect, and moral righteousness before and after conversion; and everything material that he owns, same as what the early church held, considering its own righteousness as "filthy rags".
"That I may gain Christ": not just get "an interest in him", as this he knew he had already, and should never lose it, for it commenced from all eternity and cannot be obtained by good works, nor repentance, nor faith, but is freely given. Paul wishes that he might gain a larger knowledge of Christ, without care what pains he took, what expenses he was at, nor what loss he sustained or already suffered for what he regards precious, even willing to lose more, for more of this knowledge (cf. ), because then he gain more with Christ as a "justifying righteousness": acceptance with God, pardon, life, peace, grace, and glory.

Following the Upward Call (3:12–16)
Paul emphasizes that while he has not 'obtained' (elabori) the resurrection or 'been made perfect' (NRSV, cf. ), but he said 'I press on' (dioko, lit. pursue; cf. ), 'to grasp it (katalabo), as I have been grasped by Christ Jesus'.

Citizens of earth and heaven (3:17–4:1)
Paul states that it is right to be good citizens, but 'our citizenship (politeuma) is in heaven'. Murray joins verse 4:1 with this section as the conclusion of Paul's main exhortations in chapters 2–3. The section calls on the Philippians to be  (summimetai, co-imitators) of himself, a word which is "not elsewhere preserved".

Uses

Music
"Philippians 3:20-21" is a song title in the album "The Life of the World to Come" inspired by these verses that was released by the American band The Mountain Goats in 2009.

See also
 Jesus Christ
 Knowledge of Christ
 Pharisees
 Torah
 Tribe of Benjamin
 Related Bible parts: Romans 6, Ephesians 1

References

Bibliography

External links
 King James Bible - Wikisource
English Translation with Parallel Latin Vulgate
Online Bible at GospelHall.org (ESV, KJV, Darby, American Standard Version, Bible in Basic English)
Multiple bible versions at Bible Gateway (NKJV, NIV, NRSV etc.)

03